Samuel Magowan (5 February 1910 – 1976) was an Ulster Unionist member of the Parliament of Northern Ireland. He represented Iveagh from 1964 to 1973.

He was a shopkeeper and a member of Hillsborough Rural District Council from 1955 to 1964.

He served as Assistant Whip from 1966 until 1972, also holding the office of Assistant Parliamentary Secretary at the Ministry of Finance from 1966 to 1969.

References

Sources
Biographies of Members of the Northern Ireland House of Commons
The Government of Northern Ireland

1910 births
1976 deaths
Ulster Unionist Party members of the House of Commons of Northern Ireland
Members of the House of Commons of Northern Ireland 1962–1965
Members of the House of Commons of Northern Ireland 1965–1969
Members of the House of Commons of Northern Ireland 1969–1973
Northern Ireland junior government ministers (Parliament of Northern Ireland)
Members of the House of Commons of Northern Ireland for County Down constituencies